George Lott and Lester Stoefen were the defending champions, but did not compete.

Jack Crawford and Adrian Quist defeated Wilmer Allison and John Van Ryn in the final, 6–3, 5–7, 6–2, 5–7, 7–5 to win the gentlemen's doubles tennis title at the 1935 Wimbledon Championship.

Seeds

  Wilmer Allison /  John Van Ryn (final)
  Jack Crawford /  Adrian Quist (champions)
  Jean Borotra /  Jacques Brugnon (second round)
  Don Budge /  Gene Mako (semifinals)

Draw

Finals

Top half

Section 1

Section 2

Bottom half

Section 3

The nationality of GE Bean is unknown.

Section 4

References

External links

Men's Doubles
Wimbledon Championship by year – Men's doubles